Mickaël Solvi is a French Guianan international footballer who plays as a forward.

International career
Solvi has been capped at full international level by French Guiana and scored in the 2014 Caribbean Cup group match against Cuba on 11 November 2014.

International goals
Scores and results list French Guiana's goal tally first.

References

External links
 Caribbean Football Database profile

Living people
French Guiana international footballers
French Guianan footballers
2014 Caribbean Cup players
2017 CONCACAF Gold Cup players
Association football forwards
Year of birth missing (living people)